The Blackwater River is a  tidal inlet in northeastern Massachusetts and southeastern New Hampshire in the United States.

The river forms in a salt marsh in the northeastern corner of Salisbury, Massachusetts, by the convergence of the Little River and Dead Creek.  Heading north, the river quickly enters Seabrook, New Hampshire and continues to flow through salt marsh until it reaches Hampton Harbor, northwest of Seabrook Beach, where it joins the Hampton River.

See also

List of rivers of Massachusetts
List of rivers of New Hampshire

References

Rivers of Essex County, Massachusetts
Rivers of New Hampshire
Estuaries of Massachusetts
Rivers of Massachusetts
Rivers of Rockingham County, New Hampshire
Bodies of water of Essex County, Massachusetts